The Minotaur is a family of United States solid fuel launch vehicles derived from converted Minuteman and Peacekeeper intercontinental ballistic missiles (ICBM). They are built by Northrop Grumman via contract with the Air Force Space and Missile Systems Center's Space Development and Test Directorate (SMC/SD) as part of the Air Force's Rocket Systems Launch Program which converts retired Intercontinental Ballistic Missiles into space and test launch systems for U.S. government agencies.

Three variants of the Minotaur are currently in service. The Minotaur I is an orbital launch system used to launch small satellites into low Earth orbit (LEO). The Minotaur II is a target launch vehicle (TLV), also known as Chimera, used for suborbital flights, often as a target for tracking and anti-ballistic missile tests. The Minotaur IV is a more capable LEO launch system. The Minotaur V is designed to reach higher orbits, including geostationary transfer orbit (GTO) and trans-lunar trajectories. The Minotaur III is a version under development, which will be used for suborbital flights.

The Minotaur I and II are derived from the Minuteman missile, while the Minotaur III, IV and V are derived from the Peacekeeper.

Vehicles

Minotaur-C (Taurus) 

The Taurus launch vehicle, later renamed  Minotaur-C (for "Minotaur-Commercial"), was the first of the Minotaur vehicle family, and the first ground-launched orbital booster developed by Orbital Sciences Corporation (OSC), derived by adding a solid booster stage to the air-launched Pegasus rocket. The first flight, sponsored by DARPA, was in 1994. After a series of failures between 2001 and 2011, the launch vehicle was rebranded as Minotaur-C in 2014. Due to laws against selling government equipment, the Minotaur-C is the only available Minotaur launch vehicle for commercial launches.

Minotaur I 

The original Minotaur launch vehicle, consisting of an M55A1 first stage, SR19 second stage, Orion 50XL third stage, Orion 38 fourth stage, and optional HAPS fifth stage for velocity trim and multiple payload deployment. Payload 580 kg to a 185 km, 28.5° orbit from Cape Canaveral; or 310 kg to a 740 km Sun-synchronous orbit (SSO) from Vandenberg.

Minotaur II 

A suborbital target vehicle, essentially consisting of a Minuteman II with Orbital guidance and control systems. Consists of M55A1 first stage, SR19 second stage, and M57 third stage. Payload 460 kg on 6700 km suborbital trajectory.

Minotaur III 

A suborbital target vehicle, consisting of an SR118 first stage, SR119 second stage, SR120 third stage, and Super HAPS fourth stage. Payload 3060 kg on a 6700 km suborbital trajectory.

Minotaur IV 

The Minotaur IV combines U.S. government-furnished solid rocket motors from decommissioned Peacekeeper ICBMs with technologies from other Orbital-built launch vehicles, including the Minotaur I, Pegasus, and Taurus. The Minotaur IV launch vehicle consists of an SR118 first stage, SR119 second stage, SR120 third stage, and Orion 38 fourth stage. Payload 1735 kg to a 185 km, 28.5° orbit from Cape Canaveral. The first Minotaur IV was launched 22 April 2010 from Vandenberg Air Force Base in California. This vehicle is also being developed to accommodate the Conventional Prompt Global Strike (CPGS) mission for the Air Force.

Minotaur V 

The Minotaur V is a five-stage version based on the Minotaur IV+. It has an additional upper stage for small geostationary transfer orbit (GTO), lunar, and interplanetary missions. NASA's Lunar Atmosphere and Dust Environment Explorer (LADEE) mission was launched on the first Minotaur V, from the Wallops Island, Virginia launch site at 03:27 UTC on 7 September 2013. The Minotaur launched the LADEE spacecraft into a highly elliptic orbit where it can phase and time its trajectory burn to the moon.

Minotaur VI 
A Minotaur VI five-stage version has also been conceptualized. It is also based on the Minotaur IV+, adding a second SR-118 first stage.

Launch statistics

Rocket configurations

Launch sites

Launch outcomes

Launch history

Planned launches

See also 

 Dnepr, a converted Soviet ICBM often used for commercial satellite launches
 Minotaur-C, the vehicle formerly known as Taurus
 Modified Minotaur IV, Ascent Abort-2 (AA-2), was a suborbital flight to test the Launch Abort System (LAS) of NASA's Orion spacecraft. The suborbital flight used a modified Minotaur IV, launched July 2, 2019, at 11:00 UTC from CCAFS SLC-46. The suborbital flight was a success. Reference: Wikipedia article "Ascent Abort-2.

References

External links 
 Minotaur I Rocket page
 Minotaur IV Rocket page
 
 Encyclopedia Astronautix Entry for Minotaur

 
Northrop Grumman space launch vehicles
Orbital Sciences Corporation space launch vehicles
Expendable space launch systems
Minotaur
Rocket families
Solid-fuel rockets